Moro  (Sindhi:مورو) is a city in the Naushahro Feroze District, of Sindh, Pakistan. The city is administratively subdivided into 12 Union councils. and is located on National highway (N5) in the centre of Sindh at an altitude of 28 m (95 ft) and is 12 km of the Indus River. It is the largest city in Naushahro Feroze District with a population of about 368,789 as per 2017 Census of Pakistan.

Educational Institutes
Govt Mehran Degree College
Govt High School Moro Town campus
Govt Girl High School 
Govt Girls Degree College
Bahria Foundation College
The Educators - A Project of Beaconhouse
IQRA P.H.S School Moro
Intelligentsia Science College
Habibia School of Hope. A school for orphans started by the late Shanaaz Omar Sayhebolay, funded by international and local donors.
The Insight Model Public School Bandhi Road Moro.

References

Naushahro Feroze District
Populated places in Naushahro Feroze District
Populated places in Sindh